Sergei Natanovich Bernstein (sometimes Romanized as ; 5 March 1880 – 26 October 1968) was a Ukrainian and Russian mathematician of Jewish origin known for contributions to partial differential equations, differential geometry, probability theory, and approximation theory.

Work

Partial differential equations

In his doctoral dissertation, submitted in 1904 to Sorbonne, Bernstein solved Hilbert's nineteenth problem on the analytic solution of elliptic differential equations. His later work was devoted to Dirichlet's boundary problem for non-linear equations of elliptic type, where, in particular, he introduced a priori estimates.

Probability theory

In 1917, Bernstein suggested the first axiomatic foundation of probability theory, based on the underlying algebraic structure. It was later superseded by the measure-theoretic approach of Kolmogorov.

In the 1920s, he introduced a method for proving limit theorems for sums of dependent random variables.

Approximation theory
Through his application of Bernstein polynomials, he laid the foundations of constructive function theory, a field studying the connection between smoothness properties of a function and its approximations by polynomials. In particular, he proved the Weierstrass approximation theorem and Bernstein's theorem (approximation theory). Bernstein polynomials also form the mathematical basis for Bézier curves, which later became important in computer graphics.

International Congress of Mathematicians
Bernstein was an invited speaker at the International Congress of Mathematicians (ICM) in Cambridge, England in 1912 and in Bologna in 1928 and a plenary speaker at the ICM in Zurich. His plenary address Sur les liaisons entre quantités aléatoires was read by Bohuslav Hostinsky.

Publications
 S. N. Bernstein, Collected Works (Russian):
 vol. 1, The Constructive Theory of Functions (1905–1930), translated: Atomic Energy Commission, Springfield, Va, 1958
 vol. 2, The Constructive Theory of Functions (1931–1953)
 vol. 3, Differential equations, calculus of variations and geometry (1903–1947)
 vol. 4, Theory of Probability. Mathematical statistics (1911–1946)
 S. N. Bernstein, The Theory of Probabilities (Russian), Moscow, Leningrad, 1946

See also
A priori estimate
Bernstein algebra
Bernstein's inequality (mathematical analysis)
Bernstein inequalities in probability theory
Bernstein polynomial
Bernstein's problem
Bernstein's theorem (approximation theory)
Bernstein's theorem on monotone functions
Bernstein–von Mises theorem
Stone–Weierstrass theorem

Notes

References

External links

Sergei Natanovich Bernstein and history of approximation theory from Technion — Israel Institute of Technology
Author profile in the database zbMATH

1880 births
1968 deaths
Scientists from Odesa
People from Odessky Uyezd
Odesa Jews
Soviet mathematicians
Approximation theorists
Mathematical analysts
PDE theorists
Probability theorists
19th-century mathematicians from the Russian Empire
20th-century Russian mathematicians
Expatriates from the Russian Empire in France
University of Paris alumni
Academic staff of Moscow State University
Academic staff of the National University of Kharkiv
Corresponding Members of the Russian Academy of Sciences (1917–1925)
Full Members of the USSR Academy of Sciences
Stalin Prize winners
Recipients of the Order of Lenin
Recipients of the Order of the Red Banner of Labour
Burials at Novodevichy Cemetery